Gleison Bremer Silva Nascimento (born 18 March 1997), or simply Bremer, is a Brazilian professional footballer who plays as a centre-back for  club Juventus and the Brazil national team.

Early life
The name Bremer was chosen by his father in honour of the German footballer Andreas Brehme.

Club career

Atlético Mineiro
Born in Itapetinga, Bahia, Bremer joined Desportivo Brasil in 2014, aged 17. In 2016 he was loaned to São Paulo for one year, and was initially assigned to the under-20 squad. He made his professional debut with the reserves on 12 October of that year, coming on as a late substitute in a 3–0 home loss against Rio Claro, for the year's Copa Paulista.

In March 2017, Bremer moved to Atlético Mineiro for a fee of R$ 380,000. Promoted to the main squad in June, he made his first team – and Série A – debut on 25 June, replacing injured Rodrigão in a 1–0 away win against Chapecoense. On 11 July 2017, Bremer renewed his contract until the end of 2021.

Torino
On 10 July 2018, Bremer joined Italian club Torino on a five-year deal. He made his debut with the Granata on 12 August in the Coppa Italia against Cosenza (4–0), entering in the 23rd minutes of the second half in place of Armando Izzo. On 19 August he made his debut in Serie A, once again as a substitute for Izzo, in a game lost 1–0 against Roma. Bremer made his first appearance as a starter on 3 May 2019 in the Turin deby, a 1–1 draw against Juventus. In his first season with Torino he made a total of seven appearances between Serie A and the Coppa Italia, mainly as a reserve to Emiliano Moretti and Koffi Djidji.

After Moretti's retirement at the end of the season, Walter Mazzarri began using Bremer as a starter at the beginning of the 2019–20 season. On 25 July 2019, he made his debut in UEFA competitions, in the first qualifying round of the Europa League against Debrecen. In the second qualifying round, he scored an own goal in a 3–2 home loss to Wolverhampton.

In the 2020–21 season, Bremer began to play as a starter for Torino with more continuity, and on 30 November 2020 scored the match-winning goal in an away win against Genoa (1–0). On 28 January 2020, he scored a brace in the Coppa Italia, which ended in a 4–2 defeat against AC Milan. Following the resumption of the season, he played all games as a starter for Torino and contributed a further two goals. He ended the season with a total of 35 appearances and five goals in all competitions.

On 2 February 2022, Bremer extended his contract with the club until 2024. His performances offered throughout the 2021–22 season earned him the award as the best defender of the Serie A season.

Juventus
On 20 July 2022, Bremer joined Juventus on a five-year deal. He made his competitive debut on 15 August, in a Serie A 3–0 win over Sassuolo. On 11 September, he scored his first goal for the Bianconeri, in a 2–2 draw to Salernitana in the league.

International career
On 9 September 2022, Bremer received his first call up to the Brazil national team, for friendlies against Ghana and Tunisia. He made his debut against Ghana on 23 September, in a 3–0 win. On 7 November, he was named in the squad for the 2022 FIFA World Cup.

Style of play
Bremer is a physically strong centre-back with excellent aerial ability and sense of positioning. A versatile player, he has notable speed, and has said to be inspired by the Brazilian defender Lúcio.

Career statistics

Club

International

Honours
Individual
 Serie A Best Defender: 2021–22
Serie A Team of the Year: 2021–22

References

External links
Profile at the Juventus F.C. website

1997 births
Living people
Sportspeople from Bahia
Brazilian footballers
Association football central defenders
Desportivo Brasil players
São Paulo FC players
Clube Atlético Mineiro players
Torino F.C. players
Juventus F.C. players
Campeonato Brasileiro Série A players
Serie A players
Brazilian expatriate footballers
Brazilian expatriate sportspeople in Italy
Expatriate footballers in Italy
Brazil international footballers
2022 FIFA World Cup players